Cucuruzeni is a commune in Orhei District, Moldova. It is composed of two villages, Cucuruzeni and Ocnița-Răzeși.

References

Communes of Orhei District